William Bede Dalley (5 July 1831 – 28 October 1888) was an Australian politician and barrister and the first Australian appointed to the Privy Council of the United Kingdom. He was a leading lay representative and champion of the Catholic community and was known for his parliamentary and legal eloquence.

Early life
Dalley was born at Sydney in 1831 to Irish parents, John Dalley and Catherine Spillane, who were both convicts. He was educated at the Sydney College and St Mary's College. He was called to the bar in 1856.

Political career

In 1857 Dalley was elected to the Legislative Assembly as a representative of Sydney (City). In 1858 he successfully contested Cumberland Boroughs to help Charles Cowper's re-election in Sydney. He pressed for several reforms including an unsuccessful attempt to abolish the death penalty for rape. He joined the second Cowper ministry as Solicitor General in November 1858, but held this position for only three months. In 1859 he became the member for Windsor, but resigned in February 1860 in order to visit Europe. He returned to Sydney in early 1861, and later in the year he was appointed a commissioner of emigration by the New South Wales government, went to England in 1861 with his fellow commissioner Henry Parkes, and was away about a year. He held many successful meetings in southern England and in Ireland.

After his return to Australia in 1862, Dalley resumed his legal practice, and became the leading counsel in criminal cases in Sydney and represented Carcoar from 1862 to 1864. In 1868 he defended Henry James O'Farrell for attempting to assassinate Prince Alfred, on grounds of insanity, but was not able to prevent a conviction and a speedy hanging. In 1872 Dalley married an Anglican lady, Eleanor Long, which strained his relations with the Catholic Church. She died of typhoid fever in 1881, leaving him with three young children. He supported a petition for the freeing of Frank Gardiner which had been brought by Gardiner's sisters on the grounds of the harshness of his sentence. The petition was successful; Gardiner was freed and went into exile, but the resulting public reaction led to the collapse of the Parkes government.

Attorney General
In February 1875 Dalley joined the third Robertson ministry as Attorney General of New South Wales and was nominated to the Legislative Council. He was appointed a Queen's Counsel on 19 March 1877, towards the end of his first term as Attorney General. Robertson resigned in March 1877 but was in power again five months later with Dalley in his old position until December. For the next five years Dalley took no part in politics, although in 1881 he petitioned against the Chinese restriction bill on the floor of the Legislative Council and managed to change some of its worst features. In January 1883 he became Attorney General in the Stuart ministry, and in 1884 his Speeches on the Proposed Federal Council for Australasia were published.

In February 1885 Dalley, as Acting-Premier during the absence of Stuart from the colony, offered a detachment of New South Wales troops to go to the Sudan. Though there was opposition in some quarters this was taken up with great enthusiasm in others and a contingent was sent. The Stuart ministry resigned in October 1885 and Dalley did not hold office again. In 1887 he joined with Parkes and Cardinal Moran in pleading against the hangings for the Mount Rennie rape case. Their effort was unsuccessful.

His health began to weaken and his last two years were spent practically in retirement. He died in the Sydney suburb of Darling Point. One of his sons John Bede Dalley became well known as a journalist and novelist in Sydney.

There is a memorial to him in St Paul's Cathedral.

Dalley's Castle
The homes he owned on the northern beaches were Marinella, commonly called Dalley's Castle, at Manly and a house called variously Yellamb i, Tallamalla, Bilgola House and Bilgola Cottage, immediately behind Bilgola Beach. While the house at Bilgola was built as a weekender, Marinella was built as a home, although Dalley's use of both was brief. Dalley bought 0.4ha on a knoll overlooking Manly in late 1882 and had a large home, called Marinella, erected upon it, although it was invariably known as Dalley's Castle because of its size and dominant position overlooking the village. The property Dalley bought also included an existing cottage and a stone tower that had previously housed a camera obscura. The Gothic Roman castle was built in 1882-1883 and by 1884 Dalley is listed as living there, although the following years were among his busiest and he had other properties closer to the city, so the amount of time he spent at Marinella is uncertain. Dalley's Castle was demolished in 1939, despite strong local opposition, and Housing Commission flats, ironically called Marinella, were built on the site.

Honours
Dalley refused a knighthood and the office of chief justice, but in 1886 was appointed to the privy council, the first Australian to be given that honour.

References

External links

 
 
 

|-

1831 births
1888 deaths
Members of the New South Wales Legislative Assembly
Attorneys General of the Colony of New South Wales
Solicitors General for New South Wales
Members of the New South Wales Legislative Council
19th-century Australian politicians
Australian members of the Privy Council of the United Kingdom
Australian King's Counsel